SS Henry Hadley was a Liberty ship built in the United States during World War II. She was named after Henry Hadley, an American composer and conductor.

Construction
Henry Hadley was laid down on 26 June 1944, under a Maritime Commission (MARCOM) contract, MC hull 2489, by the St. Johns River Shipbuilding Company, Jacksonville, Florida; and was launched on 8 August 1944.

History
She was allocated to the T.J. Stevenson & Co., Inc., on 22 August 1944. On 8 March 1948, she was laid up in the National Defense Reserve Fleet, Wilmington, North Carolina. On 23 May 1952, she was laid up in the National Defense Reserve Fleet, Mobile, Alabama. She was sold for scrapping, 28 October 1971, to Union Minerals & Alloys Corp. She was removed from the fleet, 23 May 1972.

References

Bibliography

 
 
 
 

 

Liberty ships
Ships built in Jacksonville, Florida
1944 ships
Wilmington Reserve Fleet
Mobile Reserve Fleet